Frederick Daniel Laryea is a Ghanaian diplomat and a member of the New Patriotic Party of Ghana. He is currently Ghana's ambassador to Ivory Coast.

Ambassadorial appointment 
In June 2017, President Nana Akuffo-Addo named Frederick Laryea as Ghana's ambassador to Ivory Coast. He was among twenty two other distinguished Ghanaians who were named to head various diplomatic Ghanaian mission in the world.

References

Year of birth missing (living people)
Living people
Ambassadors of Ghana to Ivory Coast